Riesenberg may refer to:

Places
 Riesenberg (Ore Mountains), Saxony, Germany
 Prabuty, Northern Poland
 Riisipere, Estonia
 A megalithic tomb near Nobbin, on the island of Rügen in Mecklenburg-Vorpommern, Germany

People
 Doug Riesenberg (born 1965), American NFL football player
 Felix Riesenberg (1879–1939), American maritime officer and writer
 Sidney Riesenberg (1885–1971), American illustrator and artist

Other uses
 SS Felix Riesenberg, a 1944 cargo ship
 House of Riesenberg, a West Bohemian noble family; see Hiltpoltstein Castle

See also
 Riedenberg, Bad Kissingen, Bavaria, Germany
 Riesenburg, Pomeranian Voivodeship, Northern Poland
 Reisenberg, Baden, Austria